HMS Coventry was a 28-gun sixth-rate frigate of the Royal Navy, launched in 1757 and in active service as a privateer hunter during the Seven Years' War, and as part of the British fleet in India during the Anglo-French War. After seventeen years' in British service she was captured by the French in 1783, off Ganjam in the Bay of Bengal. Thereafter she spent two years as part of the French Navy until January 1785 when she was removed from service at the port of Brest. She was broken up in 1786.

Design
A further twelve ships were built to the draught of Coventry between 1756 and 1763, as well as another five to a modified version of fir (pine) construction.

The vessel was named after the city of Coventry in England's West Midlands. In selecting her name the Board of Admiralty continued a tradition, dating to 1644, of using geographic features; overall, ten of the nineteen Coventry-class vessels, including Coventry herself, were named after well-known regions, rivers or towns. With few exceptions the remainder of the class were named after figures from classical antiquity, following a more modern trend initiated in 1748 by John Montagu, 4th Earl of Sandwich in his capacity as First Lord of the Admiralty.

In sailing qualities Coventry was broadly comparable with French frigates of equivalent size, but with a shorter and sturdier hull and greater weight in her broadside guns. She was also comparatively broad-beamed which, when coupled with Adams' modifications to her hull, provided ample space for provisions, the ship's mess and a large magazine for powder and round shot. Taken together, these characteristics would enable Coventry to remain at sea for long periods without resupply. She was also built with broad and heavy masts, which balanced the weight of her hull, improved stability in rough weather and made her capable of carrying a greater quantity of sail. The disadvantages of this comparatively heavy design were a decline in manoeuvrability and slower speed when sailing in light winds.

British career
Coventry saw active service shortly after launch. On 19 December 1757 she was chasing the 14-gun French privateer Diamond when that vessel caught fire and exploded, likely as a result of sparks flying from her guns back into the powder room. Five days later, in company with the 36-gun frigate , Coventry engaged and defeated a 24-gun privateer, Le Dragon. Six of Coventrys sailors were wounded in the brief exchange of fire with the French vessel, compared with four killed and either 10 or 12 wounded aboard the privateer. A total of 280 French sailors survived the battle and were taken prisoner aboard Coventry and Brilliant.

An inconclusive action followed for about two hours in mid-afternoon. The French broke off the action and the British vessels were too damaged to be able to catch them up again. In the action the British suffered 11 men killed and 53 wounded, including one man killed and 20 wounded aboard Coventry.

Seahorse captured Sartine on 25 August 1778. Sartine had been patrolling off Pondichery with Pourvoyeuse when they sighted two East Indiamen, which were sailing blithely along, unaware of the outbreak of war. The French vessels gave chase lazily. Sartines captain, Count du Chaillar, first had to be roused from his bed ashore. The British merchant vessels escaped, but Sartine came too close to Vernon's squadron. Vernon sent Coventry and Seahorse after her and she surrendered after a short action. A French account remarks acidly that she surrendered to a frigate of her own size without a fight. All four Royal Navy vessels in Vernon's squadron shared in the prize money. (Vernon had already sent Valentine off with dispatches.) The Royal Navy took Sartine into service as the fifth-rate frigate .

On 12 August 1782, Coventry, under the command of Captain Andrew Mitchell encountered the French frigate Bellone off Friars Hood, Ceylon. In the ensuing Action of 12 August 1782, Coventry killed the senior staff of Bellone, allowing her to escape her stronger opponent. Coventry suffered 15 men killed and 29 wounded in the engagement.

On 14 September 1782, Captain William Wolseley took command of Coventry. On the night of 12 January 1783, chasing the frigate Fine which he had mistaken for a privateer, Wolseley sailed Coventry into Ganjam Roads, where Suffren's Héros, Illustre, Ajax and Brillant were at anchor. Wolseley had no information that French vessels were in the area and so allowed the current to take him towards the vessels, the wind being weak.  As Coventry arrived, Suffren, on Héros, was sending a boat over to Illustre, but the boat master was drunk and instead mistakenly came aboard Coventry. The boat's crew was promptly taken prisoners and taken to the orlop deck. At this moment, the French division noticed Coventry, and Illustre, Ajax and Brillant opened fire. Interrogating his prisoners, Wolseley learnt that the ships firing on him were part of Suffren's squadron, at which point his men rushed below. Alone on his quarterdeck, Wolseley had no choice but to surrender.

French career
The French brought Coventry in service under the same name, under Le Carlier d'Herlye. The same day, Coventry captured the East Indiaman Bland-Fort, which had escaped Fine a few days before.

On 20 June 1783, she took part in the Battle of Cuddalore, where she was part of Suffren's frigate screen.

Fate 

The French sailed Coventry to Brest, where they decommissioned her in January 1785. She was broken up in 1786.

Notes

References

Bibliography
 Anon. (1801) The field of Mars. (Printed for J. Macgowan).
 Barras, Paul vicomte de (1895) Memoirs of Barras, member of the directorate. (Harper & brothers).
 
 Demerliac, Alain (1996) La Marine De Louis XVI: Nomenclature Des Navires Français De 1774 À 1792. (Nice: Éditions OMEGA). 

 
 
 Kippis, Andrew (1784) The New annual register, or, General repository of history, politics, and literature for the year ... (Printed for G.G.J. and J. Robinson).
 
 Lyon, David (1993) The Sailing Navy List. (London: Conway Maritime Press). .
 
 
Winfield, Rif & Stephen S Roberts (2015) French Warships in the Age of Sail 1786 – 1861: Design Construction, Careers and Fates. (Seaforth Publishing).

External links
 

1757 ships
Sixth-rate frigates of the Royal Navy
Captured ships
Maritime incidents in 1783
Frigates of the French Navy
Ships built on the Beaulieu River